Yishu: Journal of Contemporary Chinese Art is the first English-language journal specializing in Chinese art and culture. Each bi-monthly issue features scholarly essays on topical issues, interviews with artists and curators, conference proceedings, and critical commentary on exhibitions and books.

Background 
Yishu offers a platform for a wide range of voices who are living and telling the story of contemporary Chinese art from a diversity of perspectives, and who provide dialogue and debate around current visual and literary forms produced within what constitutes an expanded understanding of contemporary Chinese art.

Since its inauguration in May 2002, Yishu has raised its profile internationally to become one of the most respected journals devoted to contemporary Chinese art. Appealing to professionals in the art and academic fields, as well as art enthusiasts in general, Yishu is now the journal of record for the high quality coverage of issues and events pertinent to Chinese art today. Its high standard of critical writing by thinkers from around the world allows us to voice ideas that communicate across cultures.

Yishu is edited in Vancouver, Canada, published bi-monthly in Taipei, Taiwan, and is distributed internationally. The publishing dates are January, March, May, July, September, and November.

In 2007, the publication took part in the Documenta 12 magazines project, launched its first limited edition print by Xu Bing, and has since offered limited edition prints and photographs by some of today's most important Chinese artists, including Wang Guangyi, Rong Rong, and Inri. Each edition is commissioned by and entirely produced for Yishu.

In August 2010, the journal launched its archive web site. All articles published since 2002 are now available online for research and purchase.

Editorial staff
Katy Hsiu-chih Chien, President
Ken Lum, Founding Editor
Keith Wallace, Editor-in-Chief
Zheng Shengtian (鄭勝天), Managing Editor
Julie Grundvig, Editor
Kate Steinmann, Editor
Chunyee Li, Editor
Lara Broyde, Subscription Manager

Notable contributors

 Defne Ayas
 Colin Chinnery
 Biljana Ciric
 Jo-Anne Birnie Danzker
 Monica Dematté
 Britta Erickson
 Fan Di'an
 Gao Minglu
 Paul Gladston
 Hou Hanru
 Hu Fang
 Maya Kóvskaya
 Carol Yinghua Lu
 Victoria Lu
 Alexandra Munroe
 Hans Ulrich Obrist
 Ou Ning
 Uli Sigg
 Keith Wallace
 Zheng Shengtian

Notable featured artists

 Huang Yong Ping
 Ai Weiwei
 Xu Bing
 Gao Brothers
 Yang Fudong
 Cai Guo-Qiang
 Cang Xin
 Feng Mengbo
 Li Wei
 Tsai Ming-liang
 Ching Ho Cheng
 Wang Tiande
 Gu Wenda
 Guo Wei
 Miao Xiaochun
 RongRong
 Shu Yang
 Wang Guangyi
 Wei Guangqing
 Xing Danwen
 Yam Lau
 Yan Xiaojing
 Yue Minjun
 Zhan Wang
 Zhang Dali
 Zhang Huan
 Zhang Xiaogang
 Zhu Yu

References

External links
 Yishu official website
 Yishu Online (Yishu's official website & electronic archive of articles)

Magazines published in Taiwan
Chinese contemporary art
Contemporary art magazines
Magazines established in 2002
Bi-monthly magazines published in Canada
Magazines published in Vancouver
Visual arts magazines published in Canada
2002 establishments in British Columbia